A by-election was held for the New South Wales Legislative Assembly electorate of Mudgee on 13 January 1882 because Samuel Terry had been appointed to the Legislative Council to the seat vacated by John Robertson, which would allow Robertson to return to the Assembly as Secretary for Lands.

Dates

Results

See also
Electoral results for the district of Mudgee
List of New South Wales state by-elections

References

1882 elections in Australia
New South Wales state by-elections
1880s in New South Wales